Neefia is a genus of beetles in the family Buprestidae, the jewel beetles. The genus was established in 2003 for seven new species discovered in Madagascar.

Species include:

 Neefia gracilis Bellamy, 2003
 Neefia humeralis Bellamy, 2003
 Neefia magna Bellamy, 2003
 Neefia montana Bellamy, 2003
 Neefia rufofascia Bellamy, 2003
 Neefia rufovestita Bellamy, 2003
 Neefia semivestita Bellamy, 2003

References

Buprestidae genera
Insects of Madagascar